The city of Milwaukee, Wisconsin, is home to 119 high-rise buildings or skyscrapers, 55 of which stand at  or taller. The majority of the city's tallest buildings are located north of the Interstate 794, south of Juneau Avenue, east of Interstate 43, and west of Lincoln Memorial Drive. There are additional high-rises extending northward along Lake Michigan.

The history of skyscrapers in Milwaukee began with the Pabst Building. The Pabst Building was demolished in 1981. For nearly eighty years, from 1895 to 1973, City Hall dominated the skyline, and was at the time of its completion, the tallest habitable building in the United States. A significant building boom occurred in the 1960s, resulting in eleven of the top sixteen tallest buildings of the time having been built in that decade, and then between 1985 and 1991, six of the eight tallest buildings of the time were constructed. Another six high-rises have been proposed since the beginning of 2017.

Tallest buildings
This list ranks the fifty tallest Milwaukee skyscrapers based on standard height measurement. This includes spires and architectural details, but does not include antenna masts. The "Year" column indicates the year of completion.

Tallest under construction, approved, and proposed

This lists buildings that are under construction, approved, or proposed in Milwaukee.

Timeline of tallest buildings

Tallest demolished 
This table lists buildings in Milwaukee that were demolished and at one time stood at least  in height.

References
General
Emporis.com - Milwaukee
Specific

 
Milwaukee
Tallest in Milwaukee
Tallest buildings